A Frankfurter Würstchen (Frankfurt sausage) is a thin parboiled sausage in a casing of sheep's intestine. The flavor is acquired by a method of low temperature smoking. For consumption, Frankfurters are occasionally not boiled; they are heated in hot water for only about eight minutes to prevent the skin from bursting. They are also commonly grilled over propane or charcoal flame. They are traditionally served with bread, mustard, horseradish and/or potato salad.

History
Meat sausages as a Frankfurt speciality are already mentioned in medieval sources, often served during the Imperial coronation ceremonies at the Römerberg. Smoked Frankfurter Würstchen have protected geographical status in Germany since about 1860. Since 1929, the indication is only allowed to be used for sausages that are produced in the Frankfurt area, mainly in Neu-Isenburg and Dreieich.

Originally, Frankfurters were made without nitrite curing salt. After going through specific aging and smoking processes, the sausages, now of a golden colour, are put into wooden boxes with small sheet of parchment paper between layers. Therefore, the traditional sausages have a square cross-section, but there are a few exceptions where the sausage is round.

Other countries
Outside Germany, "frankfurter" is a common designation for boiled sausages, such as North American hot dog sausages, which are called Wiener Würstchen (Vienna sausages) in Germany. In Austria, Vienna sausages are called Frankfurter Würstl as they allegedly were brought to Vienna by Johann Georg Lahner (1772–1845), a butcher trained in Frankfurt, who in 1805 began to produce sausages from a mixture of pork and beef.

See also
 Frankfurter Rindswurst

References

 
 
 

German sausages
Hessian cuisine
Cooked sausages